A Lovely Night may refer to:

 "A Lovely Night", a song from the Rodgers and Hammerstein musical Cinderella
 "A Lovely Night", a song from the 2016 film La La Land